Mama Đút (sometimes Mama Đút Foods) is a vegan restaurant serving Vietnamese cuisine in Portland, Oregon.

Description
Mama Đút is a vegan restaurant serving Vietnamese cuisine in southeast Portland's Buckman neighborhood. The menu has included rice waffles with scallions and jackfruit, bánh mì with mock pork belly, and fried mushroom bao buns with kimchi aioli. Dessert options include strawberry lychee cheesecake, ube cinnamon rolls, pandan whoopie pies, and multiple varieties of limeades, including passion fruit and Thai tea.

History
Mama Đút was established by owner Thuy Pham in November 2020. In 2021, the business announced plans to open a second location in the Alberta Arts District in collaboration with the vegan Cuban restaurant Miami Nice.

The restaurant was featured on the Netflix series Street Food in 2022.

Reception
In 2022, Pham was nominated for a James Beard Foundation Award, in the "emerging chef" category. Waz Wu included the restaurant in Eater Portland's 2023 list of 15 "essential" vegan and vegetarian restaurants in Portland.

See also

 List of vegetarian restaurants
 List of Vietnamese restaurants

References

External links

 

2020 establishments in Oregon
Buckman, Portland, Oregon
Restaurants established in 2020
Vegan restaurants in Oregon
Vietnamese restaurants in Portland, Oregon